Pachian (also Romanized as Pāchīān and Pāchīyān; also known as Pājeyān) is a village in Jafarabad Rural District, Jafarabad District, Qom County, Qom Province, Iran. At the 2006 census, its population was 351, in 88 families.

References 

Populated places in Qom Province